A demijohn is a container for fluids used in brewing.

Demijohn may also refer to:

 Thom Demijohn, a joint pseudonym used by authors Thomas M. Disch and John Sladek for their satirical novel Black Alice
 Demijohn Lake (Ontario), a lake in Thunder Bay District, Ontario, Canada